Adam Kendall may refer to:

Adam Kendall, member of Neurosis (band)
Adam Kendall, character on Little House on the Prairie (TV series)
Adam Kendall, character on Friday Night Lights, played by Chris Burnett (actor)